Zainal bin Sapari (Jawi:زاينل ساڤري; born 30 November 1965) is a Singaporean politician. A member of the governing People's Action Party (PAP), he was the Member of Parliament (MP) representing the Pasir Ris East division of Pasir Ris–Punggol GRC between 2011 and 2020.

Early life and career
Zainal came from a family of seven, with his father working as a rank-and-file employee and his mother providing domestic assistance to an expatriate family.

Zainal was a St John’s cadet in St Andrew’s Secondary School, where he was given positions of responsibility and developed his leadership skills. While studying at Temasek Junior College, he participated actively in sports and had represented in his schools’ annual sports meet. He was also the chief editor of an in-house Malay language publication of his junior college.

In 1986, Zainal was awarded the Special Malay Bursary by the Singapore Government, where he became the first in his family to pursue an undergraduate education. He continued his education at the National University of Singapore and graduate with a Postgraduate Diploma in Education (PGDE) which propelled him into his career in education service. Zainal further his education at the Nanyang Technological University in 2007 and obtained a Master of Arts degree in Educational Management.

Zainal became a teacher, and subsequently a school principal and a superintendent with the Ministry of Education, overseeing a cluster of 12 schools in the eastern area.

Career in labor movement and politics 
Zainal started out union work with the Building Construction And Timber Industries Employees' Union (BATU) as a Director (Special Duty) of Industrial Relations, which was aligned to his interest in aiding low-wage workers. He progressed on to become the Assistant Secretary-General of NTUC and Director of NTUC Care and Share Department which helps low-wage workers, and casual and contract workers.

In the 2011 General Elections, Zainal was voted into the parliament of Singapore as one of the 5 team members of the PAP led by Minister Teo Chee Hean. The team won the contest for Pasir Ris-Punggol GRC over Singapore Democratic Alliance (SDA) led by Harminder Pal Singh with a victory of 64.79%.

In Parliament, Zainal lobbied for the Progressive Wage Model which was an improved form of minimum wage in Singapore, intent on helping low-wage workers. Zainal asked the ministry to commission a study on the living wage in Singapore before the implementation. The Progressive Wage Model was implemented in the cleaning and security sector first, followed by other sectors in the coming years.

To further protect the wages of the low-wage workers, Zainal also urged the Government to lead the charge in best sourcing in order to end “cheap sourcing”, as it will take a toll on the wages of these workers. He clearly made his stand that cheap sourcing is a “gross injustice and slavery of the poor” that has to be put to a stop.

Zainal worked very closely with the Ministry of Education, his previous employer, in implementing the Progressive Wage Model in schools as the school cleaners represent the biggest workforce of the cleaning sector in Singapore.

On top of the Progressive Wage Model, Zainal was also lobbying for mandatory payslips to be enforced in the Employment Act, in a bid to prevent salary related disputes, which especially affects the casual and contract workers, and also low-wage workers. The enforcement is still in process and it is projected to come into implementation within the next two years.

Before the 2017 Singapore presidential elections (which was reserved for the Malay community), Zainal expressed a view that the various candidates were all "Malay" enough for the reserved election, and that Speaker of Parliament Halimah Yacob should qualify to run in the reserved election. He also shared an article which disagreed with Mendaki's "shallow and rigid definition of what is Malay".

Besides his duties in Parliament and the NTUC, Zainal participates in grassroots activities. Zainal pushed for an extension of the assistance scheme Enhanced Purple Heart Programme in his constituency, where needy families in Pasir Ris East received food vouchers to supplement their monthly expenditures. Zainal takes a hands-on approach to push his agenda for low-wage workers. He even became a cleaner for one morning in order to gain first-hand experience of the difficulties faced by cleaners.

Zainal did not stand in the 2020 Singaporean general election, but however will remain as a PAP member.

Philanthropic work  

Zainal's main philanthropic work is focused on his areas of interest which is low waged workers and disadvantaged members of society.
During his tenure in the Ministry of Education, Zainal volunteered at Darul Ihsan, a Muslim orphanage, where he served in the Education Sub-Committee from 2004–2006. He is also a patron of HIRA society, a welfare organisation aimed at mentoring and providing guidance to ex-drug offenders to help re-establish them back into society.

Personal life 
Zainal is married and has 6 children.

References

1965 births
Living people
Members of the Parliament of Singapore
People's Action Party politicians
Singaporean Muslims
Singaporean people of Malay descent